Woods and Waters Winery and Vineyard was the first commercial winery in Caddo County, Oklahoma. It was located on the old Ozark Trail southwest of Anadarko and east of the community of Pine Ridge.

The winery was established in 1998 as part of a  ranch. There were  planted in different varieties of vinifera grapes: Cabernet Sauvignon, Shiraz, Zinfandel, Merlot, Chardonnay, Riseling, Gewürztraminer, and Muscat Blanc. The winery also produced several blends including "Rose of Caddo" (a blended red sweet dessert wine) as well as their own port wine.

The winery was the first Oklahoma producer of Eiswein. The winery also had a small bistro that was open for lunch and wine tastings on Saturday.

Winemaker Dale Pound died from the COVID-19 virus in December 2020 and the winery closed in 2021.

References

Wineries in Oklahoma
Caddo County, Oklahoma